Reno and the Doc is a Canadian comedy film, released in 1984. Written and directed by Charles Dennis, the film was produced Rose & Ruby Productions for First Choice.

The film stars Kenneth Welsh as Reno, a reclusive ski bum who teams up with Doc (Henry Ramer), a con man, to form a ski racing team. Quite unexpectedly, however, they also find themselves forming a love triangle with Savannah Gates (Linda Griffiths), a female sports reporter.

Awards
The film garnered four Genie Award nominations at the 6th Genie Awards in 1985:
Best Actor: Kenneth Welsh
Best Actress: Linda Griffiths
Best Original Song: "A Little Piece of Forever" (Charles Dennis and Betty Lazebnik)
Best Original Score: Betty Lazebnik

References

External links
 

1984 films
Canadian comedy television films
English-language Canadian films
Films with screenplays by Damian Lee
Canadian skiing films
1980s English-language films
1980s Canadian films